Nicholas John Andrew Langman  (born 1960) is an officer for the British secret service organisation MI6.

During 2005, he was the head of MI6 at the British Embassy in Athens.

Although British newspapers are currently forbidden from revealing Langman's name, by the standing D-Notice against printing the names of serving intelligence officers, on 30 December 2005 the British Newspaper The Morning Star ran a front-page article naming him. In its 7 January 2006 edition, the British Newspaper Socialist Worker also named him. The British satirical magazine Private Eye also named Langman in its 6 January 2006 (No. 1149) edition.

Langman was appointed Companion of the Order of St Michael and St George (CMG) in the 2017 New Year Honours for services to British foreign policy.

Notes

External links 
 "HM Diplomatic Service Overseas Reference List" – July/August 2005

1960 births
Living people
English spies
Secret Intelligence Service personnel
Companions of the Order of St Michael and St George